Lithophane leautieri, the Blair's shoulder-knot, is a moth of the family Noctuidae. It is found in Europe. It originated from the area surrounding the Mediterranean Sea, but gradually moved north.

Technical description and variation

The wingspan is 39–44 mm. Forewing pale grey, dusted with olive grey; lines strongly dentate, but much obscured, marked by short oblique costal streaks; upper stigmata ill-defined, but united at their base by a long black line; the reniform with fulvous in lower half; claviform elongate, black-edged, united by a short black streak with outer line; a well-marked black streak from base on submedian fold; submarginal line indicated only by black dentate marks preceding it, of which the two on the folds are longest; fringe mottled dark and light grey; hindwing pale brownish grey, darker towards termen; ab. sabinae Geyer is rather smaller, blue-grey, more distinctly marked, especially the median shade and submarginal teeth; reniform stigma with hardly any fulvous in it; the two black lines on submedian fold hardly visible.

Biology
The moth flies from September to mid-November.

The larva is dark green, dorsal and subdorsal lines white, segmentally swollen and partially interrupted; spiracular line yellowish white. The larvae feed on various cypress species.

Notes
The flight season refers to Belgium and The Netherlands. This may vary in other parts of the range.

References

External links

Blair's shoulder-knot at UKmoths
Funet Taxonomy
Fauna Europaea
Lepiforum.de
Vlindernet.nl 

leautieri
Moths of Europe
Moths described in 1829
Taxa named by Jean Baptiste Boisduval